The 2011 NBA All-Star Game was an exhibition basketball game that was played on February 20, 2011, during the National Basketball Association's (NBA) 2010–11 season. It was the 60th edition of the NBA All-Star Game, and was played at Staples Center in Los Angeles, home of the Los Angeles Clippers and the Los Angeles Lakers. The Western Conference defeated the Eastern Conference, 148–143. Kobe Bryant was named the All-Star Game Most Valuable Player.

The Clippers and Lakers were both awarded the All-Star Game in an announcement by commissioner David Stern on June 9, 2009. This was the second time that the Staples Center had hosted the All-Star Game; the arena had previously hosted the event in 2004. This will be the fifth time that Los Angeles had hosted the All-Star Game; before Staples Center opened in 1999, the city had previously hosted the event in 1963, 1972, and 1983. Rihanna, Kanye West, and Drake were the halftime performers, while Keri Hilson, Lenny Kravitz and Bruno Mars were the entertainment for pre-show festivities.

All-Star Game

Coaches

The coaches for the All-Star Game are the head coaches of the teams with the best winning percentage in each conference through the games of February 6, two weeks before the All-Star Game. However, an NBA rule also prohibits a coach from being selected for consecutive All-Star Games, even if his team again holds the conference's best record. Because George Karl and Stan Van Gundy coached in the 2010 All-Star Game, they were not eligible for selection.

The coach for the Western Conference team was San Antonio Spurs head coach Gregg Popovich. This was the second time Popovich was selected to be an All-Star coach, after previous selection in 2005. The coach for the Eastern Conference team was Boston Celtics head coach Doc Rivers. This was the second time Rivers was selected to be an All-Star coach, after previously being selected in 2008.

Players

The rosters for the All-Star Game are chosen in two ways. The starters were chosen via a fan ballot. Two guards, two forwards and one center who receive the highest vote were named the All-Star starters. The reserves were chosen by votes among the NBA head coaches in their respective conferences. The coaches were not permitted to vote for their own players. The reserves consists of two guards, two forwards, one center and two players regardless of position. If a player were unable to participate due to injury, the commissioner would select a replacement.

Kobe Bryant of the Los Angeles Lakers topped the All-Star Ballots with 2,380,016 votes, which earned him a starting position in the Western Conference team. Carmelo Anthony, Kevin Durant, Chris Paul and Yao Ming completed the Western Conference starting position. Anthony, Duncan and Bryant are all starters for the previous year's Western Conference team. The Western Conference reserves feature 3 first-time selections, rookie Blake Griffin, Kevin Love, and Russell Westbrook. Griffin became the first rookie since Yao Ming to play in the All-Star game.

The Eastern Conference leading vote-getter was Dwight Howard with 2,099,204 votes. LeBron James, Derrick Rose, Amar'e Stoudemire and Dwyane Wade completed the Eastern Conference starting position. Howard, Miami Heat teammates James and Wade all started for the East in the previous year's game. The Eastern Conference reserves includes 4 Celtics: Ray Allen, Kevin Garnett, Paul Pierce and Rajon Rondo. Al Horford, Rondo and Rose were selected to the All-Star game for the second times.

Yao missed the game due to injury; he was replaced by NBA commissioner David Stern with Love. Western Conference coach Gregg Popovich selected Tim Duncan to replace Yao in the starting lineup.

Roster

 Yao Ming was unable to participate due to injury.
 Kevin Love was named Yao Ming's replacement by NBA commissioner David Stern.
 Gregg Popovich selected Tim Duncan to start in place of Yao.

Game

Kobe Bryant, selected to his 13th straight All-Star game after becoming the leading vote-getter, had 37 points, 14 rebounds, and three steals and won his fourth All-Star Game Most Valuable Player (MVP) Award, tying Hall of Famer Bob Pettit for the most All-Star MVP awards. LeBron James had the second triple-double in All-Star Game history with 29 points, 12 rebounds, and 10 assists. Blake Griffin is the first rookie to play in the All-Star since Yao Ming in 2003.

All-Star Weekend

T-Mobile Rookie Challenge

The T-Mobile Rookie Challenge featured a team of standout first-year players ('Rookies') against a team of standout second-year players ('Sophomores'). The game was divided into two twenty-minute halves, similar to college basketball. The participating players were chosen by voting among the league's assistant coaches. The Rookie team included five of the top ten picks from the 2010 NBA Draft: DeMarcus Cousins, Derrick Favors, Wesley Johnson, Greg Monroe and John Wall. 2009 first overall pick Blake Griffin, who missed the  due to injury, was also selected to the rookie team. The Sophomores team featured six players from the previous Rookie Challenge game: DeJuan Blair, Stephen Curry, Tyreke Evans, Taj Gibson, James Harden and Brandon Jennings. However, Evans was later replaced by Harden due to injury.

The head coaches for the Rookies and Sophomores teams were the lead assistants from the All-Star Game coaching staffs, Mike Budenholzer from the San Antonio Spurs and Lawrence Frank from the Boston Celtics. They were assisted by two All-Stars and two veterans who served as assistant coaches: Carmelo Anthony, Amar'e Stoudemire, Steve Kerr and Kevin McHale. Budenholzer, McHale and Stoudemire coached the Rookie team while Frank, Anthony and Kerr coached the Sophomore team.

 Tyreke Evans was unable to participate due to injury.
 James Harden was named Tyreke Evans' replacement.

The Rookies defeated the Sophomores 148–140, extending their winning streak to two games. Rookie's John Wall, who scored 12 points and notched a record 22 assists, was named MVP. He is joined by his former Kentucky teammate DeMarcus Cousins, who scored a game-high 33 points and had 14 rebounds. James Harden, who was born in LA, led the Sophomores with 30 points and DeJuan Blair had 28 points and a game-high 15 rebounds. Rookie's Blake Griffin, who also participated in the Slam Dunk contest and the All-Star game, only played 13 minutes and had 14 points. Both teams started the first half strong; the Rookies only had a 2-point advantage at halftime. The game remained close in the second half and the Rookies eventually came out with a victory.

Sprite Slam Dunk Contest

On January 5, 2011, the four contestants for the dunk contest were announced. Blake Griffin, JaVale McGee, Serge Ibaka, and Brandon Jennings were all chosen to participate. On January 20, it was announced that DeMar DeRozan would replace Jennings due to his foot injury. For this edition, the contestants were also provided with a 'dunk coach': Griffin was mentored by Kenny Smith, McGee was paired with Chris Webber, Ibaka was mentored by teammate Kevin Durant, and DeRozan paired up with Darryl Dawkins as his mentor.

During the first round, McGee made two perfect score dunks, including a dunk that had him dunk three basketballs at once, sending him to the finals. Griffin, who scored a total of 95 points in the first round, also entered the finals. In the second round, McGee and Griffin each made their two dunks, but Griffin won with 68% of the fans votes after he dunked over the hood of a car, with an assist by Baron Davis.

 Unable to participate due to injury. DeMar DeRozan was named as a replacement for Brandon Jennings.

Foot Locker Three-Point Contest

The Foot Locker Three-Point Shootout featured six players: defending champion Paul Pierce returned to defend his title, competing against Celtics teammate Ray Allen, Kevin Durant, Daniel Gibson, James Jones, and Dorell Wright.Jones won the contest with a score of 20 points in the final round, ahead of Pierce with 18 and Allen who scored 15.

Taco Bell Skills Challenge

The Taco Bell Skills Challenge was contested by five players. Chris Paul, a three-time contestant, have been automatically selected to participate. He went against Stephen Curry, Derrick Rose, John Wall, and Russell Westbrook, who were voted in by the fans from a pool of 8 candidates. In this contest, the contestants had to complete an "obstacle course" consisting of dribbling, passing and shooting stations. The contestant who finished the course with the fastest time wins the contest. All contestants had to comply with basic NBA ball-handling rules while completing the course. Curry won the event with 28.2 seconds in the final round against Westbrook who finished with 44.2 seconds.

Haier Shooting Stars Competition

BBVA Celebrity All-Star Game 

The BBVA Celebrity All-Star Game featured two teams composed of retired NBA and WNBA players, actors, comedians, singers, celebrities, and others. The game was divided into four eight-minute quarters. The head coaches were NBA Hall of Famers Bill Walton and Magic Johnson. Their assistants were comedians Ty Burrell and Jason Alexander. Each team featured fake "general managers" who simulated to have chosen the team.

The game's MVP was chosen by voting of the audience through text messaging. At the end of the game, Justin Bieber was announced the MVP. Bieber scored eight points (3–11 FG), and had two rebounds and four assists. NBA legend Chris Mullin said of Bieber, "He's got a nice little game... but more importantly, he's got great passion. It looked like he loves the game."

D-League All-Star

D-League All-Star Game
The Eastern Conference All-Stars defeated the Western Conference All-Stars 115–108 in the game held at the Los Angeles Convention Center. Courtney Sims of the Iowa Energy won the All-Star MVP honors by scoring 25 points on 10/13 field goal shooting.

 Dexter Pittman did not participate due to injury.
 Scottie Reynolds was named as Pittman's replacement.
 Cedric Jackson, Marcus Landry and Jerel McNeal were named as replacements for Dowdell, Johnson and Shakur.
 Zabian Dowdell, Trey Johnson and Mustafa Shakur were currently called up by the Phoenix Suns, Toronto Raptors and Washington Wizards, respectively.

D-League Dream Factory Friday Night

Slam Dunk Contest
For the second straight year, Dar Tucker won the D-League Dream Factory Slam Dunk Contest, beating Chris Johnson in the finals. In the final round, Tucker got the assist from Bakersfield Jam's Jeremy Wise then dunked over New Mexico teammate Shane Edwards for the score of 50.

 Latavious Williams did not participate due to injury.
 Derrick Byars was named as Williams' replacement.

Three-Point Shootout
Booker Woodfox won the NBA D-League Dream Factory Three-Point Shootout, defeating Scottie Reynolds 16–7 in the final round. Woodfox advanced to finals after defeating Marcus Landry 20–17 in the tie-breaker shootoff (both players were tied at 16 at the end of the first round).

International broadcasting rights

References

External links
 
 2011 NBA All-Star Game at Basketball Reference
 2011 NBA All-Star Game at ESPN

2011
All-Star Game
NBA All-Star Game, 2011
NBA All-Star
ABS-CBN television specials